Gibbozaena mirabilis is a species of beetle in the family Carabidae, the only species in the genus Gibbozaena.

References

Paussinae